The Achelous-class repair ship was a class of ship built by the US Navy during World War II.

As the United States gained experience in amphibious operations, it was realized that some sort of mobile repair facility would be useful for repairing the damage that frequently occurred to smaller vessels such as LCVP's (Landing Craft Vehicle/Personnel). The Auxiliary Repair Light (ARL) ship was designed to meet this need, and the Achelous class was the only class to receive this designation.

Description

Achelous-class vessels were based on the same hull as LST's (Landing Ship, Tank) which at the time were being produced in large numbers. This hull was thought to be ideal for a ship specializing in the repair of light craft, since it was not overly large and had a shallow draught which would enable it to maneuver into small harbors, rivers and inlets where it could service damaged boats and effect other repairs on location.

The conversion from an LST to an Achelous-class ARL was done mainly by converting the large interior tank deck into a number of different shops and storerooms. Two large cargo booms were added forward, and a large 60-ton A-frame boom added amidships. The wheelhouse/chart room deck was expanded, and a conning tower added. The first nine units of the class sealed the bow doors of the LST hull.

The ship's company consisted of the usual LST crew of deck, engineering and communications departments but in addition it had a supply department, plus a repair department consisting of machinery and engine repair, carpentry, electronics repair, and hull repair divisions, giving a ship's complement of approximately 250 officers and men in total. After the first nine units were built, the later units had a revised armament as well as retaining the opening bow doors.

Operational history
During World War II, the Achelous-class vessels worked mostly on repairing damaged landing craft, but many continued in service after the war, working again on landing craft during the Korean War and on river craft during the Vietnam War.

In all, 39 Achelous-class repair ships were built between 1943 and 1945.

Ships in Class

References
 What is an ARL? – USS Askari (ARL-30) Association
 Ships of the U.S. Navy, 1940–1945
 US Navy, ships World War 2, page 119

 
 
 
Auxiliary repair ship classes